Francesco Manuel Bongiorno (born 1 September 1990) is an Italian racing cyclist, who currently rides for UCI Continental team .

Major results

2008
 6th Overall Giro della Lunigiana
1st Stage 3
2009
 10th GP Folignano
2010
 1st Ruota d'Oro
 2nd Giro del Casentino
 3rd Overall Giro della Valle d'Aosta
 6th Giro del Belvedere
2011
 7th Trofeo Gianfranco Bianchin
 10th Overall Girobio
2012
 1st  Road race, National Under-23 Road Championships
 1st Gran Premio Palio del Recioto
 3rd Overall Toscana Coppa delle Nazioni
1st Stage 3
 4th Trofeo Città di San Vendemiano
 5th Overall Giro del Friuli-Venezia Giulia
 6th Trofeo Banca Popolare di Vicenza
 9th Overall Giro della Valle d'Aosta
2013
 2nd Tre Valli Varesine
 3rd Overall Settimana Ciclistica Lombarda
1st  Young rider classification
 5th Overall Danmark Rundt
 5th Giro dell'Emilia
 7th Overall Settimana Internazionale di Coppi e Bartali
1st  Young rider classification
 8th GP Industria & Artigianato di Larciano
2014
 3rd GP Industria & Artigianato di Larciano
 4th Overall Settimana Internazionale di Coppi e Bartali
 5th Overall Tour of Slovenia
1st Stage 3
 5th Giro dell'Emilia
 7th Overall Tour du Limousin
1st  Young rider classification
 10th Overall Tour Méditerranéen
2015
 4th Overall Settimana Internazionale di Coppi e Bartali
 6th Giro dell'Appennino
2017
 1st  Overall Tour of Albania
1st Stage 4
 4th GP Adria Mobil
 7th Gran Premio di Lugano
2019
 8th Overall Tour of Almaty
2020
10th Overall Tour de Langkawi

Grand Tour general classification results timeline

References

External links

 

1990 births
Living people
Italian male cyclists
Sportspeople from Reggio Calabria
Cyclists from Calabria